1226 Golia, provisional designation , is a metallic asteroid from the central region of the asteroid belt, approximately 15 kilometers in diameter. It was discovered on 22 April 1930, by Dutch astronomer Hendrik van Gent at Leiden Southern Station, annex to the Johannesburg Observatory in South Africa. It is named for Jacobus Golius.

Orbit and classification 

Golia orbits the Sun in the central main-belt at a distance of 2.3–2.9 AU once every 4 years and 2 months (1,516 days). Its orbit has an eccentricity of 0.11 and an inclination of 10° with respect to the ecliptic. The body's observation arc begins at Johannesburg one night after its official discovery observation, with no precoveries taken and no prior identifications made.

Physical characteristics 

Golia has been characterized as a metallic M-type asteroid by the Wide-field Infrared Survey Explorer (WISE).

Rotation period 

In March 1992, the first reliable rotational light curve of Golia was obtained by Italian astronomer Mario Di Martino using the ESO 1-metre telescope at La Silla in northern Chile. Analysis gave a well-defined rotation period of 4.097 hours with a change in brightness of 0.35 magnitude. Another light curve was obtained from photometric observations in the R-band at the Palomar Transient Factory in October 2011, giving a period of 4.0910 hours and an amplitude of 0.24 magnitude.

Diameter and albedo 

According to preliminary results by the NEOWISE mission of NASA's WISE space telescope, Golia measures 11.68 and 12.18 kilometers in diameter, and its surface has an albedo of 0.187 and 0.172, respectively, while the Infrared Astronomical Satellite IRAS gives a diameter of 16.39 kilometers and an albedo of 0.239. The Collaborative Asteroid Lightcurve Link considers Golia to be of stony composition, deriving an albedo of 0.1008 and a diameter of 15.92 kilometers, using an absolute magnitude of 12.1.

Naming 

This minor planet was named after Dutch professor of astronomy Jakob Gool (1596–1667), also known as Jacobus Golius, who founded the Leiden Observatory in 1633. He was a mathematician and orientalist, who translated Arabic texts into Latin including the work of 9th-century Muslim astronomer Al-Farghani. He was also a teacher of French philosopher René Descartes, after whom the minor planet 3587 Descartes is named. The official naming citation was compiled by Lutz Schmadel for the Dictionary of Minor Planet Names based on a private communication with Ingrid van Houten-Groeneveld at Leiden.

References

External links 
 Asteroid Lightcurve Database (LCDB), query form (info )
 1226 Golia at WolframAlpha
 Dictionary of Minor Planet Names, Google books
 Asteroids and comets rotation curves, CdR – Observatoire de Genève, Raoul Behrend
 Discovery Circumstances: Numbered Minor Planets (1)-(5000) – Minor Planet Center
 
 

 

001226
Discoveries by Hendrik van Gent
Named minor planets
19300422